The First 400 Years is a 1964 Australian television play. It was filmed in Adelaide. The stars were performing in the play around Australia for JC Williamsons.

It screened in two parts.

Premise
A collection of scenes from the plays of William Shakespeare.

Part One was more comic consisting of:
the wooing scene from Taming of the Shrew
Katherin's plea to the Royal Court in Henry VIII
the scene with Lance and his dog from Two Gentlemen of Verona
the church scene between Beatrice and Benedict in Much Ado About Nothing.

Part two was more serious consisting of:
two scenes from The Merchant of Venice
the balcony scene from Romeo and Juliet
the closing scene from Hamlet.

Cast
Googie Withers
Keith Michell
Jeannette Serke
Joan MacArthur
Raymond Westwell
Bruce Barry
Alston Harvey
Malcolm Phillips
John Derum

Original play
The show was based on a play directed by Raymond Westwell for J.C. Williamsons. It premiered in Melbourne on 23 April 1964, the 400th anniversal of Shakespeare's birth.

"What a profligate waste of costumes," wrote Column 8 in Sydney Morning Herald.

Production
It was rehearsed and filmed in one day and the ABC's studios in Adelaide. Sterling said "Fortunately the stage production was almost ideal for TV> I tried to place the cameras in such a way that there was very little adjustment of movement and although the studio was smaller than the stage acting area, the production transposed well."

Reception
The Sunday Sydney Morning Herald reviewer said it "lit up the screen... these couple of superb artists in action. My only complaint is that 30 minutes was not long enough."

One viewer called it "dull, flat and unprofitable."

References

External links

Australian television films
1964 television plays
Films shot in Adelaide
Films directed by William Sterling (director)